Sathi Geetha (born 5 July 1983) is an Indian track and field athlete from Palakollu, Andhra Pradesh. She is a sprinter specializing in the 400 metres.

Sathi Geetha was born on 5 July 1983 in Maruteru, coming from a Telugu Hindu traditional and small middle-class family.

Geetha finished seventh in 4 × 400 metres relay at the 2004 Summer Olympics, together with teammates K. M. Beenamol, Chitra K. Soman and Rajwinder Kaur. Geetha also won a silver medal at the 2005 Asian Championships in a personal best time of 51.75 seconds.

See also
List of Asian Games medalists in athletics
List of National Sports Award recipients in athletics

References 
 

1983 births
Living people
Sportswomen from Tamil Nadu
Indian female sprinters
Olympic female sprinters
Olympic athletes of India
Athletes (track and field) at the 2004 Summer Olympics
Athletes (track and field) at the 2008 Summer Olympics
Asian Games gold medalists for India
Asian Games gold medalists in athletics (track and field)
Athletes (track and field) at the 2006 Asian Games
Athletes (track and field) at the 2010 Asian Games
Medalists at the 2006 Asian Games
World Athletics Championships athletes for India
Recipients of the Dhyan Chand Award
21st-century Indian women
21st-century Indian people